Prasanta Chandra Mahalanobis Mahavidyalaya (formerly Bon Hooghly College of Commerce), established in 1965, is a general degree college in Baranagar, Kolkata. It offers undergraduate courses in arts, commerce and sciences.  It is affiliated to West Bengal State University.

Accreditation
The National Assessment and Accreditation Council (NAAC) visited the college in 2008 and accredited it with 'B' grade.

History 
Prasanta Chandra Mahalanobis Mahavidyalaya (Formerly Bon Hooghly College of Commerce) was established in 1965 as a private evening Commerce College affiliated to the University of Calcutta.

Academic departments

Science
Chemistry
Mathematics
Computer Science
Food and Nutrition

Arts
Bengali
English
Geography
Sociology
Philosophy
Economics
Education

Commerce
Accountancy

See also
Education in India
List of colleges in West Bengal
Education in West Bengal

References

External links
Prasanta Chandra Mahalanobis Mahavidyalaya

Universities and colleges in North 24 Parganas district
Colleges affiliated to West Bengal State University
Educational institutions established in 1965
1965 establishments in West Bengal
Baranagar